Furcifer timoni is a species of chameleon, a lizard in the family Chamaeleonidae.  The species is endemic to Madagascar.

Etymology
The specific name, timoni, is in honor of Timon Robert Glaw (born 2004), who is the son of German herpetologist Frank Glaw, senior author of this species.

Geographic range and habitat
Furcifer timoni is endemic to the Montagne d'Ambre National Park (Amber Mountain National Park) near the northern tip of Madagascar. Based on some photographic records, it may also be found in the Marojejy National Park (Marojejy Massif), although this fact has not been confirmed. Its preferred natural habitat is forest.

Conservation status
Furcifer timoni has been ranked by the International Union for Conservation of Nature (IUCN) to be Near Threatened, and it is one of eleven species of chameleon discovered since 1999. It has been listed by the IUCN as Near Threatened because there is a possible threat which may affect the species. If the threat were to become active, Furcifer timoni would not become Critically Endangered. Instead, as it has a range of 385 square kilometres (149 square miles) in one place, it would be able to be classified as endangered. There are also threats of logging for charcoal and the collection of rosewood.

Description

Female specimens of F. timoni have a base colour of green, and a yellow-orange underside. The body is covered in blue spots, and the top of the head is red with blue spots. The head of males of the species is green with purplish spots.

Reproduction
Furcifer timoni is oviparous. Female specimens have been found with up to 14 eggs.

Taxonomy
Furcifer timoni was initially described as a new species in 2009 by German herpetologists Frank Glaw, Jörn Köhler, and Miguel Vences.

References

Further reading
Glaw F, Köhler J, Vences M (2009). "A distinctive new species of chameleon of the genus Furcifer (Squamata: Chamaeleonidae) from the Montagne d'Ambre rainforest of northern Madagascar ". Zootaxa 2269: 32-42. (Furcifer timoni, new species).

Furcifer
Near threatened animals
Vulnerable biota of Africa
Endemic fauna of Madagascar
Reptiles of Madagascar
Reptiles described in 2009
Taxa named by Frank Glaw
Taxa named by Jörn Köhler
Taxa named by Miguel Vences